De Monfort is an 1800 Gothic tragedy by the British writer Joanna Baillie.  It was originally published in the author's Plays on the Passions in 1798. It premiered at the Theatre Royal, Drury Lane, then under the management of Richard Brinsley Sheridan, on 29 April 1800. The cast featured John Philip Kemble as De Montfort, Sarah Siddons as Jane De Montfort, Montague Talbot as Rezenvelt, William Barrymore as Count Freberg, John Powell as Manuel, William Dowton as Jerome, Thomas Caulfield as Grimbald and Elizabeth Heard as Countess Freberg. It was revived at the same theatre in 1821 with Edmund Kean in the title role.

References

Bibliography
 Evans, Bertrand. Gothic Drama from Walpole to Shelley. University of California Press, 2022.
 Hogan, C.B (ed.) The London Stage, 1660–1800: Volume V. Southern Illinois University Press, 1968.
 Roy, David. Romantic and Revolutionary Theatre, 1789-1860. Cambridge University Press,2003.
 Snodgrass, Mary Ellen. Encyclopedia of Gothic Literature.Infobase Publishing,  2014.

1800 plays
West End plays
Tragedy plays
British plays
Plays set in Germany